The Wapack Wilderness is a  tract of forest in the towns of Rindge and New Ipswich, New Hampshire. The land is owned by the Hampshire Country School, a small, private school for students who do not thrive in traditional settings. It abuts Binney Pond Natural Area and land conserved by the New England Forestry Foundation. Watatic Mountain Wildlife Area is two miles (3 km) to the southeast, and Annett State Forest is two miles (3 km) to the northeast. The headwaters of the Millers River flow from the area, feeding into Converse Meadows and Lake Monomonac before entering Massachusetts.

The wilderness contains more than a mile of the historic Wapack Trail and features wetlands, rare natural communities, rocky ridges, and old-growth forest. The area is rich with wildlife, including moose, bobcat, fisher, mink, weasel, beaver, otter, white-tailed deer, coyote, red fox, ducks, warblers, and salamanders.

Notes

External links 
Hampshire Country School
Friends of the Wapack
New Ipswich Conservation Commission
Northeast Wilderness Trust

Protected areas of Hillsborough County, New Hampshire
Protected areas of Cheshire County, New Hampshire
Forests of New Hampshire